Pano Capéronis (born 16 August 1947) is a Swiss former freestyle swimmer. He competed at the 1964 Summer Olympics and the 1968 Summer Olympics.

References

External links
 

1947 births
Living people
Swiss male freestyle swimmers
Olympic swimmers of Switzerland
Swimmers at the 1964 Summer Olympics
Swimmers at the 1968 Summer Olympics
Sportspeople from Lausanne